Vaso Laskaraki (Greek: Βάσω Λασκαράκη; born Vasiliki Laskaraki, October 19, 1979) is a Greek actress, formerly starring in I Polykatoikia. She is also known for her roles in Filodoxies, Ihni, Klemmema Oneira, To Soi Sou and Erotas.

Early life
She was born and raised in Thessaloniki, Greece to Anastasia Laskaraki (née Vamvakidou) and Christos Laskarakis. After school, she studied acting at National Theatre of Northern Greece's drama school.

Filmography

Television

Film

Theatrography

Personal life
Laskaraki began dating Greek actor Giannis Tsimitselis in 2009, after meeting on the set of tv serie I Polykatoikia. They married on October 24, 2013 in Athens and on November 10, 2013 she gave birth to their daughter, Evangelia "Eva" Tsimitseli. On September 28, 2017 Laskaraki and Tsimitselis announced their divorce with their lawyer's statement on media. On April 24, 2019, Laskaraki married Greek chef Lefteris Soultatos in Crete, Greece.

References

External links

Fan Club
Vaso Laskaraki interview about her character in I Polykatoikia and her life as an actress from Mega Channel translated by Google Translate

Living people
1985 births
Greek actresses
Actors from Thessaloniki